Thomas Stretch (March 30, 1697 – October 19, 1765) was an American clockmaker and a founder and first Governor of the Colony in Schuylkill, later known as The State in Schuylkill, or Schuylkill Fishing Company. In 1753 he erected the first clock at Independence Hall in Philadelphia, a large clock dial and masonry clock case at the west end of the structure.

Family
Born at Staffordshire, England, he came to America with his father, Peter Stretch, in 1702. The earliest known clockmakers in Leek, Staffordshire were members of the Quaker family named Stretch.  Samuel Stretch, Peter Stretch's uncle, was making lantern clocks in Leek in 1670.

Thomas Stretch married July 29, 1743, Mary Anne Robins, who died and was buried in Friends' Burial Ground, Philadelphia, October 10, 1781, in the sixty-ninth year of her age. Although Thomas followed his father's example in his craft and philanthropy, he did not do so personally.  Thomas married out of the Quaker faith and was censured by the Monthly Meeting. As a result, "Thomas Stretch brought in a paper [to the Meeting] signed by himself & Wife condemming their unchaste freedom before Marriage as well as their disorderly procedure in Marriage," surely an embarrassment to his parents.

Of their five children only one lived beyond childhood, Peter Stretch II (1746-1793) who married Sarah Howell (1754-1825), daughter of Samuel Howell (1723-1807), eminent Philadelphia merchant and a financier of the American Revolution and Sarah Stretch (1727-1770), a daughter of Thomas's brother Joseph Stretch.  Thomas and Mary's daughters: Mary Stretch (died 1744); Elizabeth Stretch (died 1747); Ann Stretch (died 1750) and Sarah Stretch (died 1756). Thomas Stretch was buried at Friends Burial Ground, Philadelphia, on October 19, 1765.

His son Peter, who was not of age when Thomas made his will in 1760, was left his clocks, watches, tools, etc. Half of his property went to his beloved wife Mary. Thomas Stretch's brother, Joseph, and his nephew Isaac Stretch were his executors. The will is proved October 23, 1765.

Clockmaker

Thomas Stretch's father, Peter Stretch, became one of the most important clockmakers in colonial America, noted for his magnificent tall case clocks, intricate watches and clocks, and scientific instruments. His shop was at the southeast corner of Front and Chestnut Streets, Philadelphia, Pennsylvania, USA, then called "Peter Stretch's Corner at the Sign of the Dial".   Soon after the death of his father, Thomas Stretch sold his father's property at the Sign of the Dial and established himself a block farther west, at the southwest corner of Second and Chestnut Streets.

During his prime years, Thomas Stretch was probably the most competent clockmaker in Philadelphia. In 1752, when Isaac Norris (statesman) was selecting a man to build the first clock for the State House, today known as Philadelphia's Independence Hall, he chose Thomas Stretch, the son of his old friend and fellow council member, to do the job.

In 1753 Thomas Stretch erected a large clock dial and masonry clock case at the west end of Independence Hall in Philadelphia.  That equipment, which resembled a giant tall clock (grandfather clock), had been removed in about 1830. The clock's dials were mounted at the east and west ends of the main building connected by rods to the clock movement in the middle of the building.  The western end had a masonry structure designed to look like the clock case. The acquisition of the original clock and bell by the Pennsylvania Colonial Assembly is closely related to the acquisition of the Liberty Bell. By mid-1753, the clock had been installed in the State House attic, but six years were to elapse before Thomas Stretch received any pay for it.

During the summer of 1973 a replica of the Thomas Stretch clock was restored to Independence Hall. The $159,000 replica included a 14-foot copy of the clock case atop a 40-foot soapstone column, just the way it looked during the Revolutionary War. To lessen danger of deterioration, the original delicate wood carvings were instead cast in polyester bronze. The only major concession in modernism: the clock, with an eight-foot dial painted red-brown and Persian blue, is powered by electricity rather than wooden works and weights.

While conducting a study of early clockmakers in Philadelphia, Carolyn Stretch located in the Philadelphia area twenty clocks by Peter Stretch (1670-1746), seven by his son Thomas Stretch (1695-1765), and two by Thomas' brother William Stretch (1701-1748). Watches made by Thomas Stretch were also greatly treasured by their owners. That she had not been so successful in locating many of the clocks made by Thomas Stretch is attributed to the fact that they have reached the hands of dealers and been scattered across the country. By 1710, the Stretch clocks had not only a minute hand but also a second hand. The most sophisticated Peter Stretch clock found was owned by The State in Schuylkill.

Among the known tall case clocks with works by Thomas Stretch are one exhibited in the Governor's Palace at Colonial Williamsburg; one with a walnut case at the Philadelphia Museum of Art (see Ruth Davidson, "Museum Accessions", The Magazine Antiques (July 1970:60)); and one illustrated in William Distin and Robert Bishop, The American Clock, 1976, no.37. An eight-day tall case clock by Thomas Stretch, circa 1740, is at Keith House-Washington's Headquarters, the historic home of Gov. William Keith, located at Graeme Park and administered by the Pennsylvania Historical and Museum Commission.

A Queen Anne carved and figured mahogany tall case clock, by Peter Stretch, Philadelphia, circa 1740, was bought at auction by Winterthur Museum and Country Estate on October 28, 2004, for the highest price ever paid for an American clock: $1.7 million.

Civic activities
Thomas Stretch was one of the founders of Pennsylvania Hospital and a member of the Union Fire Company, also known as Benjamin Franklin's Bucket Brigade. He was a director of the Philadelphia Contributionship (Hand-in-Hand fire mark) from 1758 to 1761.

In the Pennsylvania Gazette of May 29, 1755, Thomas Stretch appears as one of the largest subscribers (with Benjamin Franklin and others) to the fund for the Pennsylvania Hospital.  In essence, the Stretch family and Benjamin Franklin provided half of the original capital to found the hospital. The list of subscribers reads:
                		

Thomas Stretch and Joseph Stretch were sons of Peter Stretch (1670-1746) and Margery Hall (1668-1746). It is likely the reference to Isaac Stretch is to Isaac Stretch (1714-1770), son of Daniel Stretch (1694-1746), another son of Peter Stretch and Margery Hall. The Stretch family were Quakers.

Joseph Stretch, mentioned above, was at this time "His Majesty's Collector of Excise for the City and County of Philadelphia", as may be seen from a notice in the Pennsylvania Gazette of October 28, 1756; and subsequently, in 1768, he was "His Majesty's Collector of Customs, etc., for the Port of Philadelphia". Robert Harding was pastor of St. Joseph's Church.

Founder of Schuylkill Fishing Company
The founders of the social club known as Schuylkill Fishing Company numbered twenty, each of whom was either then or later prominent in Philadelphia's business and civic life.

Like Thomas Stretch, many of the early members were Quakers. When its organization took on formal shape, it was an emulation of Pennsylvania's provincial government. Thomas Stretch was named the club's first governor in 1732, and re-elected annually until his death in 1765. He was member No. 1, elected May 1, 1732.

Under Governor Stretch, the colony in Schuylkill prospered in its peaceful pursuits. In the year 1747, for their more convenient accommodation, they resolved to build a "Court House" for the meetings of the Governor, Assembly and colonists, on the slope facing the river, amid the stately walnut trees, some of which furnished the timber. Its members, in 1748, built their first Court House near the City of Philadelphia, on the west side of the Schuylkill River where the Girard Avenue bridge now crosses. The place was then a wilderness, its denizens the fowls of the air, and the fish, which in quantities almost incredible, filled the river.

With much mock formality and discipline, the Schuylkill Fishing Company pursued its piscatorial and fowling interests, upon the success of which depended their meals. Fish or game not caught or killed by its members was not allowed to be served. The annual election of officers, at which Governor Stretch was regularly returned, took place each October. Something of the flavor of the Colony's procedures may be sensed in a proclamation issued by Governor Stretch on September 29, 1744, "the twelfth year of my Government".  Evidently in an effort to encourage his colonists to promote game for the year's final meeting on October 4, Stretch called to their attention by Proclamation:

In 1782, "The Colony in Schuylkill" became the "State in Schuylkill".

Thomas Stretch's son, Peter Stretch, his brother, Joseph Stretch, and Joseph's son, Isaac Stretch, were also members of the State in Schuylkill.  Samuel Howell, also a member of the State in Schuylkill, married Thomas' niece, Sarah Stretch. Samuel and Sarah Howell's daughter, Sarah Stretch Howell, married Thomas Stretch's son Peter Stretch (1746–1792), also a member, as was Samuel's son, Samuel Howell, Jr.

References
Notes

Bibliography
"A History of the Schuylkill Fishing Company of the State in Schuylkill, 1732-1888." Philadelphia: The State in Schuylkill, 1889.

Fennimore, Donald L. and Hohmann, III, Frank L. "Stretch. America's First Family of Clockmakers." A Winterthur Book. The Henry Francis duPont Winterthur Museum, Inc. and Hohmann Holdings, LLC. 2013.
 
Frazier, Arthur H.  "The Stretch Clock and its Bell at the State House".  Pennsylvania Magazine of History and Biography,  XCVIII (1974)

Milnor, William. "An Authentic Historical Memoir of the Schuylkill Fishing Company of the State in Schuylkill . . . (Philadelphia, 1850)

Stretch, Carolyn Wood. "Peter Stretch, Clockmaker — 1670-1746". International Studio Magazine. October, 1930. pp 47–49.

Stretch, Carolyn Wood. "Early Colonial Clockmakers in Philadelphia".  Pennsylvania Magazine of History and Biography, LVI (1932), p 226.

1695 births
1765 deaths
American Quakers
American clockmakers
English emigrants
People of colonial Pennsylvania
People from Philadelphia
People from Leek, Staffordshire